Ted Mann can refer to:
 Ted Mann, an American businessman who owned a chain of movie theaters including Mann's Chinese Theater.
 Ted Mann (writer), former National Lampoon Editor, actor, writer, movie and television producer
Theodore D. Mann, longest-serving mayor of Newton, Massachusetts
Theodore Augustine Mann, English naturalist and historian
Theodore Mann, American theater director who co-founded New York City's Circle in the Square Theatre
 Edward "Ted" Mann, Canadian Horse Racing Hall of Fame trainer
Ted Mann (journalist), credited with breaking the story on Bridgegate